"Early Morning Love" is a single released by Motown singing group The Supremes. It is the third and final single released from their 1975 self-titled album, The Supremes. This song reached #6 on the Disco Singles chart.

Personnel
Lead vocals by Mary Wilson
Background vocals by Scherrie Payne, Mary Wilson and Cindy Birdsong

References

1975 singles
1975 songs
The Supremes songs
Song recordings produced by Brian Holland
Songs written by Eddie Holland
Motown singles